"Swang" is a song by American hip hop duo Rae Sremmurd. It was released on January 24, 2017, by EarDrummers and Interscope Records as the fourth single from their second studio album SremmLife 2. The song was written alongside producer P-Nazty.

Music video
The song's accompanying music video. premiered on February 16, 2017 on Rae Sremmurd's YouTube account on Vevo. The video was directed by Max. The music video has over 465 million views as of November 2021.

Remix
The official remix of "Swang" features American rapper Travis Scott and was released on October 16, 2016.

Personnel
Credits adapted from SremmLife 2 booklet.

Song credits

Writing – Aaquil Brown, Khalif Brown, Pierre Slaughter
Production – P-Nazty
Recording – Randy Lanphear & Swae Lee at Sauce Studios and PatchWerk Recording Studios in Atlanta, Georgia
Audio mixing – Finis "KY" White at Bass Recording Studios in Atlanta, Georgia
Mastering – Dave Kutch, The Mastering Palace, New York City

Charts

Weekly charts

Year-end charts

Certifications

References 

2017 songs
2017 singles
Rae Sremmurd songs
Interscope Records singles
Songs written by Swae Lee
Songs written by Slim Jxmmi
Cloud rap songs